Hepatocyte growth factor-regulated tyrosine kinase substrate is an enzyme that in humans is encoded by the HGS gene.

Interactions 

HGS has been shown to interact with:

 CLTC 
 DLG4, 
 EPS15, 
 IL2RB, 
 Merlin, 
 STAM2, 
 Signal transducing adaptor molecule
 TSG101.

References

External links 
 PDBe-KB provides an overview of all the structure information available in the PDB for Human Hepatocyte growth factor-regulated tyrosine kinase substrate (HGS)

Further reading